Hans Andersen (born 12 March 1939) is a Danish former footballer who played as a midfielder for Køge BK and the Danish national team.

References

1939 births
Living people
Danish men's footballers
Denmark international footballers
Køge Boldklub players
Danish 1st Division players
Danish 2nd Division players
Association football midfielders